2009–10 Moldovan National Division season is the 19th Moldovan National Division season in the history of FC Zimbru Chișinău.

Current squad 
Squad given according to the official website as of the end of the season, June 6, 2010

UEFA Europa League

Qualifying round

See also
 2014–15 FC Zimbru Chișinău season

References

External links 
 Official Zimbru Website

Moldovan football clubs 2009–10 season
FC Zimbru Chișinău seasons